Gorlovka is a rural locality (a village) in Fominskoye Rural Settlement, Gorokhovetsky District, Vladimir Oblast, Russia. The population was 7 as of 2010.

Geography 
Gorlovka is located 51 km southwest of Gorokhovets (the district's administrative centre) by road. Svyato is the nearest rural locality.

References 

Rural localities in Gorokhovetsky District